The Grave relief of Publius Aiedius and Aiedia is an ancient Roman grave relief from the first half of the first century, now kept in the Pergamonmuseum / Antikensammlung Berlin, with Inventory number SK 840 (R 7).

It was found in Rome on the Via Appia. It is made of which marble and is 64 cm wide and 99 cm high. In 1866 it was purchased for the predecessor of the modern Antikensammlung Berlin.

The inscription under the relief reads:

Translated:

Publius Aiedius Amphio is identified by the L in the inscription as libertus or freedman of a Publius Aedius. His slave name, the Greek name Amphio, typical for Roman slaves, is retained as his last name. The name of the wife, also identified as a freed slave of Publius Aedius, was Fausta Melior. Therefore, the social position of the pair is clear. The two slaves had gained a form of Roman citizenship on receiving their freedom, but it was of a lower class only, which bound them ever more to their former owner, who was now their patron. Yet they now had the freedom, among other things, to enter into a legal marriage and children produced from such a marriage would be normal Roman citizens.

The relief emphasises this situation further. The two are depicted in an almost coldly realistic way. No sign of an intimate connection or love can be seen. Both extend their hands towards the centre of the image, showing thereby their serious union and their status as a legally married couple. The wife's finger has two rings, indicating a degree of prosperity had been achieved by the pair. The image includes so much of their bodies that it is possible to identify the clothing worn by the pair. Aiedia wears a chiton and cloak, Aiedius a toga, which was reserved for free citizens.  His age and bodily blemishes are also undisguised. Wrinkles are depicted, carved deep into their skin, just as his leathery skin and the warts on his forehead and around his mouth are. All this recalls the traditional portraits on wax death masks. Age and its characteristics were signs of the worth (dignitas) and excellence (virtus), with which he had worked his way out of slavery.

Today there are more than 125 reliefs of this type known. The similarity to windows, from which they get their name, is no accident. Such reliefs were placed in the walls of larger grave buildings and are often found, like windows next to doors which led into the grave building itself. The depictions "looked out" from their windows along the streets lined with tombs which led into ancient Rome. It was not unusual for freedmen to be interred in the large mausolea of their former masters.

Bibliography 
 Max Kunze. "Grabrelief eines römischen Ehepaares." Staatliche Museen zu Berlin. Preußischer Kulturbesitz. Antikensammlung (Ed.): Die Antikensammlung im Pergamonmuseum und in Charlottenburg. von Zabern, Mainz 1992, pp. 202f.
 "Grabrelief eines römischen Ehepaares". Königliche Museen zu Berlin (Ed.), Alexander Conze (Ed): Beschreibung der antiken Skulpturen mit Ausschluss der pergamenischen Fundstücke. Spemann, Berlin 1891, p. 325 (Inventory no. 840).

Archaeological discoveries in Italy
1st-century Roman sculptures
Aiedius and Aiedia
Sculptures of men in Germany
Sculptures of women in Germany
Marble sculptures in Germany
Classical sculptures of the Berlin State Museums